is a previous Japanese defence minister. He is a politician of the Democratic Party of Japan, a member of the House of Councillors in the Diet (national legislature). A native of Nagano, Nagano and graduate of Waseda University, he was elected to the House of Councillors for the first time in 1992 after serving in the assembly of Nagano Prefecture for five terms. He had joined the Democratic Party of Japan in 1998. On 16 September 2009; Kitazawa was appointed as the Minister of Defence by Prime Minister Yukio Hatoyama. He was re-appointed by Prime Minister Naoto Kan in the cabinet shift, and was the Minister of Defence until 2 September 2011.

He retired in 2016, and was succeeded by Hideya Sugio.

References

External links 

  in Japanese.

|-

1938 births
Democratic Party of Japan politicians
Japanese defense ministers
People from Nagano (city)
Living people
Members of the House of Councillors (Japan)